A Gentleman of Paris is a 1927 American silent comedy film loosely based on the novel and play  Bellamay the Magnificent by Roy Horniman. The film was directed by Harry d'Abbadie d'Arrast and stars Adolphe Menjou, Arlette Marchal, Nicholas Soussanin, Lawrence Grant, and William B. Davidson. The feature has been preserved and was released on DVD in 2010. The movie was also the basis for the 1928 film A Certain Young Man.

Plot summary
Marquis de Marignan is a brazen womanizer who spends most of his life escaping the wrath of husbands he has angered. Joseph, his faithful valet frequently rescues Marignan from disaster. But when Joseph finds out that his boss has been sleeping with his wife, he plots a scheme to publicly humiliate Marquis by exposing him as a card cheat. The ruse works, but Marignan manages to have the last laugh by faking his own suicide and returning to haunt Joseph into confessing his scheme.

Cast
 Adolphe Menjou as Marquis de Marignan
 Shirley O'Hara as Jacqueline
 Arlette Marchal as Yvonne Dufour
 Ivy Harris as Henriette
 Nicholas Soussanin as Joseph Talineau
 Lawrence Grant as General Baron de Latour
 William B. Davidson as Henri Dufour
 Lorraine MacLean as Cloakroom Girl

References

External links

dvd of the film
Still at nypl.org
Stills and a review at mysteryfile.com

1927 films
1927 comedy films
American black-and-white films
1920s English-language films
American silent feature films
Paramount Pictures films
Films based on British novels
Silent American comedy films
Films with screenplays by Herman J. Mankiewicz
Films directed by Harry d'Abbadie d'Arrast
1920s American films